Rhodobium may refer to:
 Rhodobium (insect), genus of true bugs in the family Aphididae
 Rhodobium (bacterium), a bacterium genus in the family Rhodobiaceae